Portrait of Francesco Maria della Rovere is an oil on panel, later transferred to canvas, painting attributed to Giorgione, executed c. 1502. It is now housed in the Kunsthistorisches Museum in Vienna. It depicts Francesco Maria I della Rovere, Duke of Urbino aged about 13.

References

Paintings by Giorgione
1502 paintings
Paintings in the collection of the Kunsthistorisches Museum